V. R. Muthu is the chief Executive officer of Idhayam oil. He hails from Virudhunagar in Tamil Nadu. His father V. V. V. Rajendran found Idhayam oil in 1986.

References 

Tamil businesspeople
Living people
Year of birth missing (living people)